Ghamai Zadran (born 26 September 1996) is an Afghan cricketer. He made his List A debut for Amo Region in the 2017 Ghazi Amanullah Khan Regional One Day Tournament on 10 August 2017. He made his first-class debut for Mis Ainak Region in the 2017–18 Ahmad Shah Abdali 4-day Tournament on 20 October 2017. He made his Twenty20 debut on 8 October 2019, for Amo Sharks in the 2019 Shpageeza Cricket League.

References

External links
 

1996 births
Living people
Afghan cricketers
Amo Sharks cricketers
Kabul Eagles cricketers
Mis Ainak Knights cricketers
People from Paktia Province